Volodymyr Koval (born 6 March 1992) is a professional Ukrainian football striker.

International career
He was called up by manager Serhiy Kovalets for the squad of the Ukraine national under-21 football team to participate in the 2013 Commonwealth of Independent States Cup in Russia.

References

External links

1992 births
Living people
Footballers from Kyiv
Ukrainian footballers
FC Dynamo Kyiv players
FC Sevastopol players
Ukrainian Premier League players
Ukrainian expatriate footballers
Expatriate footballers in Poland
OKS Stomil Olsztyn players
Bruk-Bet Termalica Nieciecza players
Olimpia Grudziądz players
Ekstraklasa players
Ukrainian expatriate sportspeople in Poland
Expatriate footballers in Belarus
Ukrainian expatriate sportspeople in Belarus
FC Chornomorets Odesa players
FC Neman Grodno players
FC Livyi Bereh Kyiv players
Association football forwards
Ukraine youth international footballers
Ukraine under-21 international footballers